George Bernard Butler Jr. (1838–1907) was a portrait, genre, animal, and still life painter. Butler was born in New York City, where he studied art under Thomas Hicks.

In 1859 he went to Paris to study under Thomas Couture, then returned to serve in the military during the Civil War. Despite the loss of his right arm, Butler continued his art career in New York and San Francisco, and was elected a National Academician in 1873. Two years later he returned to Europe and remained in Italy for an extended period.

References 

American male painters
1838 births
1907 deaths
19th-century American painters
19th-century American male artists
Painters from New York City
People of New York (state) in the American Civil War
American amputees
Artists with disabilities
National Academy of Design members